Platyrrhinodexia is a genus of parasitic flies in the family Tachinidae. There are at least two described species in Platyrrhinodexia.

Species
Platyrrhinodexia moyobambensis Townsend, 1929
Platyrrhinodexia punctulata Townsend, 1927

References

Dexiinae
Diptera of South America
Taxa named by Charles Henry Tyler Townsend
Tachinidae genera